Reiner Stahel (15 January 1892 – 30 November 1955) was a German officer and war criminal. He is best known for his retreat from Vilna and the command of the garrison of Warsaw during the Warsaw Uprising of 1944. Arrested by the NKVD in Romania, he spent the rest of his life in Soviet captivity.

Early life
Stahel was born in Bielefeld.

World War I 
He joined the German Army during World War I. By the end of the war, he had moved to Finland and joined the Finnish Army participating in the Finnish Civil War.

Interwar 
In 1933 he went to Nazi Germany where he worked at the Ministry of Aviation.

World War II 
Stahel participated in the German invasion of the Soviet Union as commander of Flakregiments 34 (June 1941), Flakregiment 99 (April 1942) and 4th Luftwaffe Field Division (September 1942). During the Battle of Stalingrad, Stahel conducted defensive actions at the head of Kampfgruppe Stahel. On 21 January 1943, he was promoted to Major General and then transferred to Air Fleet 4.

At the end of May 1943, he was appointed commander of the new 22nd Flak Brigade in Italy and entrusted with protecting the Strait of Messina. Following the German retreat from Sicily and Italy's surrender, Stahel was made the military commander of Rome in September 1943.

1944 
In July 1944, he commanded the Vilnius garrison in the Vilnius offensive and was able to postpone the seizure of that city by the Red Army. For his efforts, on 28 July 1944, he was awarded the Swords to the Knight's Cross and promoted to the rank of lieutenant general.

Warsaw uprising 
Stahel was transferred to Warsaw, where he was to defend the city against the advancing Red Army. However, the Soviet offensive was halted. Instead, on August 1, the Warsaw Uprising was started by the Polish Home Army. On the uprising's first day, Stahel was surrounded in his headquarters in the Saxon Palace, and he lost control of the situation. On August 4, command over Nazi forces in Warsaw was given to Waffen-SS commander Erich von dem Bach-Zelewski and Stahel's pocket was subordinated to the new commander. By August 7, the Dirlewanger Brigade reached Stahel's positions in the city centre, although he did not resume his command over the city's garrison.

Suppression of Warsaw uprising 
Despite his relatively limited role in suppressing the Warsaw uprising of 1944, Stahel was responsible for a series of crimes committed against Warsaw's civilians. On August 2, he ordered the killing of all men identified as actual or potential insurgents and taking civilian hostages to be used as human shields when assaulting insurgent positions. Testimonies of the soldiers of the 562nd Grenadier Division's Grenadier Regiment East Prussia 4 who arrived in Warsaw on August 3 show that Stahel gave them the order to "kill all men encountered, remove women and children, and burn houses." Moreover, Stahel ordered the execution of Polish prisoners held in Mokotów prison and officially sanctioned looting, allowing German soldiers to take anything they wanted from houses on fire.

Romania 
On August 24, he was dispatched to Bucharest, where the German headquarters anticipated similar urban warfare; his troops attempted to occupy Romania's capital Bucharest on August 24, but they were repulsed by troops loyal to King Michael I.  During this and the coming days, Romania switched sides, and the Red Army entered the city almost unopposed.

On 20 September 1944, Stahel was arrested by the NKVD together with Field Marshal Ion Antonescu. Interrogated on his part in the Warsaw Uprising, he was imprisoned in the Soviet Union. The exact date of his death is a subject of controversy. 

According to Soviet sources, Stahel died on 30 November 1952 in Vladimir central transfer prison. However, other sources mention that Stahel died in 1955 in the Voikovo officer prison camp of a heart attack when he was informed of his possible transfer to Germany.

Awards
 Iron Cross (1914) 2nd Class (12 October 1914) & 1st Class (24 March 1915)
 Iron Cross (1939) 2nd Class (16 July 1941) & 1st Class (18 September 1941)
 Knight's Cross of the Iron Cross with Oak Leaves and Swords
 Knight's Cross on 18 January 1942 as Oberstleutnant and commander of Flak-Regiment 34.
 Oak Leaves on 4 January 1943 as Oberst and commander of a Luftwaffe-Kampfgruppe "Stahel"
 Swords on 18 July 1944 as Generalmajor'' and commander of Fester Platz Wilna

References

Citations

Bibliography

 
 

1892 births
1955 deaths
Nazi Party officials
German Army personnel of World War I
Luftwaffe World War II generals
Recipients of the Knight's Cross of the Iron Cross with Oak Leaves and Swords
Recipients of the Order of the Cross of Liberty, 2nd Class
Recipients of the Order of the Cross of Liberty, 3rd Class
Military personnel from Bielefeld
People from the Province of Westphalia
German people who died in Soviet detention
Warsaw Uprising German forces
Prussian Army personnel
Finnish Army personnel
Lieutenant generals of the Luftwaffe
Holocaust perpetrators in Poland
People of the Finnish Civil War (White side)
German expatriates in Finland
Nazis who died in prison custody